Francis Xavier Vira Arpondratana (born October 3, 1955) is a Bishop of Chiang Mai, Thailand, appointed on February 10, 2009.

Biography
Born in Sam Sen, Bangkok, Francis Xavier Vira Arpondratana was ordained a priest for the Archbishop of Bangkok on June 7, 1981 by then Archbishop Michael Michai Kitbunchu. He was the vice-rector of St. Joseph's Minor Seminary in Sampran from 1981-1985. He went to study Youth Pastoral Ministry and Catechesis at Salesian University in Rome from 1985-1988. He then served as a Director of the Diocesan Catechesis Centre until his appointment as bishop (1988–2009). He also serves as Secretary of the Episcopal Commission for Catechesis. He was also a chaplain of St. Joseph Convent school from 1990-1998.

On February 10, 2009, Pope Benedict XVI appointed him as Bishop of Chiang Mai. He was ordained on May 1, 2009 by Cardinal Michael Michai Kitbunchu. Co-consecrators were the Apostolic nuncio in Thailand, Archbishop Salvatore Pennacchio, and Joseph Sangval Surasarang, former Bishop of Chiang Mai.

Coat of arms

The bishopric coat of arms is subdivided into four fields.  The blue (azure) symbolizes the separation from the worldly values and the ascent of the soul toward God, therefore the run of the spiritual Virtues which raise themselves from the things of the earth toward the incorruptibility of the sky. On this background we see the flame radiant, symbol of the light which comes from God, from His Word here represented by the book of the Holy Scripture. The concept of the light wants also to recall the "Lux Mundi" seminary where Msgr. Vira Arpondratna served as a teacher. The flame and the book are in gold (or) the metal most noble, the symbol of the first virtue, the Faith; indeed is by the Faith that we can totally understand the strength of the guiding light which comes from God and from His Word. The letters Alpha and Omega are in red, the colour of love, the love of the Father for us.

The silver (argent) is the symbol of the transparency, then of the Truth and Justice, fundamental dowries of the pastoral solicitude of the Bishop.

The star symbolizes Our Celestial Mother, the Blessed Virgin Mary; the chequy fess comes from the coat of arms of St.Xavier family, to remind the name of the Bishop while the green mountains, in heraldic shape, want to underline the nature of the diocese of Chiang Mai.

Motto
"OMNIA FACIO PROPTER EVANGELIUM" (1 Cor 9,23)

For his motto, Bishop Vira, has chosen the words from the 1st Epistle to the Corinthians of St Paul to mean that his pastoral plan is founded on the total adhesion to the message of love and salvation of the Gospel.

References

External links

Catholic Hierarchy 
Bangkok Archdiocese (Thai)

1955 births
Living people
Francis Xavier Vira Arpondratana
21st-century Roman Catholic bishops in Thailand